Ham (July 1957 – January 19, 1983), a chimpanzee also known as Ham the Chimp and Ham the Astrochimp, was the first Great Ape launched into space. On January 31, 1961, Ham flew a suborbital flight on the Mercury-Redstone 2 mission, part of the U.S. space program's Project Mercury. 

Ham's name is an acronym for the laboratory that prepared him for his historic mission—the Holloman Aerospace Medical Center, located at Holloman Air Force Base in New Mexico, southwest of Alamogordo. His name was also in honor of the commander of Holloman Aeromedical Laboratory, Lieutenant Colonel Hamilton "Ham" Blackshear.

Early life
Ham was born in July 1957 in French Cameroon (now Cameroon), captured by animal trappers and sent to the Rare Bird Farm in Miami, Florida. He was purchased by the United States Air Force and brought to Holloman Air Force Base in July 1959.

There were originally 40 chimpanzee flight candidates at Holloman. After evaluation, the number of candidates was reduced to 18, then to six, including Ham. Officially, Ham was known as No. 65 before his flight, and only renamed "Ham" upon his successful return to Earth. This was reportedly because officials did not want the bad press that would come from the death of a "named" chimpanzee if the mission were a failure.  Among his handlers, No. 65 had been known as "Chop Chop Chang".

Training and mission

Beginning in July 1959, the two-year-old chimpanzee was trained under the direction of neuroscientist Joseph V. Brady at Holloman Air Force Base Aero-Medical Field Laboratory to do simple, timed tasks in response to electric lights and sounds. During his pre-flight training, Ham was taught to push a lever within five seconds of seeing a flashing blue light; failure to do so resulted in an application of a light electric shock to the soles of his feet, while a correct response earned him a banana pellet.

On January 31, 1961, Ham was secured in a Project Mercury mission designated MR-2 and launched from Cape Canaveral, Florida, on a suborbital flight.
Ham's vital signs and tasks were monitored by sensors and computers on Earth. The capsule suffered a partial loss of pressure during the flight, but Ham's space suit prevented him from suffering any harm. Ham's lever-pushing performance in space was only a fraction of a second slower than on Earth, demonstrating that tasks could be performed in space. Ham's capsule splashed down in the Atlantic Ocean and was recovered by the USS Donner later that day. His only physical injury was a bruised nose. His flight was 16 minutes and 39 seconds long.

The results from his test flight led directly to the mission Alan Shepard made on May 5, 1961, aboard Freedom 7.

Later life

On April 5, 1963, Ham was transferred to the National Zoo in Washington, D.C. where he lived for 17 years before joining a small group of chimps at North Carolina Zoo on September 25, 1980.

After his death on January 19, 1983, Ham's body was given to the Armed Forces Institute of Pathology for necropsy. Following the necropsy, the plan was to have him stuffed and placed on display at the Smithsonian Institution, following Soviet precedent with pioneering space dogs Belka, and Strelka. However, this plan was abandoned after a negative public reaction. Ham's skeleton is held in the collection of the National Museum of Health and Medicine, Silver Spring, Maryland, and the rest of Ham's remains were buried at the International Space Hall of Fame in Alamogordo, New Mexico. Colonel John Stapp gave the eulogy at the memorial service. 

Ham's backup, Minnie, was the only female chimpanzee trained for the Mercury program. After her role in the Mercury program ended, Minnie became part of an Air Force chimpanzee breeding program, producing nine offspring and helping to raise the offspring of several other members of the chimpanzee colony. She was the last surviving Astro-chimpanzee and died at age 41 on March 14, 1998.

Cultural references
Ray Allen & The Embers released the song "Ham the Space Monkey" in 1961.
 Tom Wolfe's 1979 book The Right Stuff depicts Ham's spaceflight, as do its 1983 film and 2020 TV adaptations.
 The 2001 film Race to Space is a fictionalized version of Ham's story; the chimpanzee in the film is named "Mac".
 In 2007, a French documentary made in association with Animal Planet, Ham—Astrochimp #65, tells the story of Ham as witnessed by Jeff, who took care of Ham until his departure from the Air Force base after the success of the mission. It is also known as Ham: A Chimp into Space / Ham, un chimpanzé dans l'espace.
 The 2008 3D animated film Space Chimps follows anthropomorphic chimpanzees and their adventures in space. The primary protagonist is named Ham III, depicted as the grandson of Ham.
 In 2008, Bark Hide and Horn, a folk-rock band from Portland, Oregon, released a song titled "Ham the Astrochimp", detailing the journey of Ham from his perspective.

See also

 Animals in space
 Monkeys and apes in space
 Albert II, a rhesus monkey who became the first mammal in space in June 1949
 Enos, the second of the two chimpanzees launched into space, and the only one to orbit Earth
 Laika, a Soviet space dog and the first animal to orbit Earth
 Yuri Gagarin, the first human in space, orbited in April 1961
 Félicette, the only cat in space
 One Small Step: The Story of the Space Chimps, 2008 documentary
Spaceflight 
 List of individual apes

References

Further reading
  Brief biography of Ham, aimed at children ages 9–12.
  A novel about Ham and his trainer.
  Book covering the life and flight of Ham, plus other space animals.

External links

 Pictures from the NASA Life Sciences Data Archive
 Who2 profile: Ham the Chimp
 Animal Astronauts
 Chimp Ham: "Trailblazer In Space" 1961 Detroit News
 In Praise of Ham the Astrochimp  in LIFE

1957 animal births
1983 animal deaths
1961 in spaceflight
Animals in space
Individual chimpanzees
NASA
Project Mercury
Non-human primate astronauts of the American space program